Rozina  Qureshi, or just Rozina (born September 21, 1950), is a Pakistani film actress. She is known for movies like Armaan (1966), Josh (1966), Ehsaan (1967), Ishara (1968), Tum hi ho mehboob mere (1969), Khamosh Nigahen (1971), Basheera (1972), and Daulat aur dunya (1972). She won a Nigar Award for best supportive actress in the movie Ishara (1968).
Rozina is the mother of model/actress Saima Qureshi and the aunt of actor/producer Faysal Quraishi.

Early life
Rozina was born in a Christian family, as Ivy Cynthia, on September 21, 1950, in Karachi. In the early 1960s, she lived with her sister, Raheela, and her mother at Pakistan Chowk, Karachi. She was educated at St. Joseph School Karachi.

Career
Rozina started her career with film "Hamein Bhi Jeenay Do" in 1963 as a supporting actress. She gradually progressed from supporting to leading roles in films. Her first film as a heroine was Ishqe Habib (1965) which was based on a religious theme. She was paired with the romantic hero Waheed Murad in several notable movies like, Josh (1966), Khamosh Nigahein (1971), and Daulat Aur Dunya (1972). She was labelled as a "glamorous actress" by the critics and the viewers. After working in 61 Urdu and 32 Punjabi films, Rozina ended her cinema career with her last movie, Mashriq Maghrab, that was released in 1985.

In the commercials
In the late 1960s, Rozina gained enormous popularity by appearing in a 'Lipton' tea jingle along with Nirala for Pakistan television. She also showed her face in a Lux advertisement in the 60s.

Personal life
Rozina married the sound specialist, Riffat Qureshi and converted to Islam as Ayesha Qureshi. She has a daughter, Saima Qureshi, who is a model and actress. TV actor and producer Faysal Quraishi is her nephew.

Retirement and later life
After leaving films in 1985, she devoted herself to her family. Her husband died on September 21, 1995, in Karachi. Laterly, she has inclined towards religion and doesn't like much to talk about her film career. She performed a pilgrimage (Umrah) along with her daughter in 2020. She now lives in Karachi.

Filmography

Film

Awards and recognition

References

External links
 

1950 births
Living people
People from Karachi
Pakistani film actresses
Nigar Award winners
20th-century Pakistani actresses
Actresses in Urdu cinema
21st-century Pakistani actresses
Actresses in Punjabi cinema